Biathlon at the 2003 Asian Winter Games was held at the Iwakisan Sports Park in Iwaki, Japan from 3 February to 7 February 2003.

Schedule

Medalists

Men

Women

Medal table

Participating nations
A total of 35 athletes from 5 nations competed in biathlon at the 2003 Asian Winter Games:

References
Results

External links
Schedule

 
2003 Asian Winter Games events
2003
Asian Games